The McNutt-Howard House is a historic house in Maryville, Tennessee, U.S.. It was built circa 1900 for Robert G. McNutt. It was built in the Queen Anne and Classical Revival architectural styles. It belonged to W. B. Howard from 1908 to the 1930s. It has been listed on the National Register of Historic Places since July 25, 1989.

References

National Register of Historic Places in Tennessee
Queen Anne architecture in Tennessee
Neoclassical architecture in Tennessee
Houses completed in 1900
Blount County, Tennessee